Calgary-Mackay  was a provincial electoral district in Calgary, Alberta, Canada, mandated to return a single member to the Legislative Assembly of Alberta using the first past the post method of voting from 2004 to 2012.

History
The Calgary-MacKay electoral district was created in the 2003 electoral boundary re-distribution from the Calgary-Nose Creek electoral district.

The Calgary-MacKay electoral district would be dissolved in the 2010 Alberta boundary re-distribution and would be re-distributed into the Calgary-Northern Hills and Calgary-Mackay-Nose Hill electoral districts.

Boundary history

Members of the Legislative Assembly (MLAs)

Election results

2004 general election

2008 general election

Senate election results

2004 Senate nominee election district results

Voters had the option of selecting 4 candidates on the ballot.

Alberta student vote 2004

On November 19, 2004, a student vote was conducted at participating Alberta schools to parallel the 2004 Alberta general election results. The vote was designed to educate students and simulate the electoral process for persons who have not yet reached the legal majority. The vote was conducted in 80 of the 83 provincial electoral districts with students voting for actual election candidates. Schools with a large student body that reside in another electoral district had the option to vote for candidates outside of the electoral district than where they were physically located.

See also
List of Alberta provincial electoral districts

References

Further reading

External links
Elections Alberta
The Legislative Assembly of Alberta
Electoral Divisions Act, SA 2003, c E-4.1 on CanLII

Former provincial electoral districts of Alberta
Politics of Calgary